The 3rd Army Division is a unit of the Peruvian Army.

History
The unit was created on December 15, 1961 and activated on the same date a year later, named as the 3rd Military Region. From 2002 until 2013 it was known as the Southern Military Region.

The unit's coat of arms features both Republican and Incan symbolism similar to that of other units, as well as the Misti, located in the outskirts of Arequipa.

Organization
The 3rd Army Division is formed by the following units:
3rd Armored Brigade
6th Armored Brigade
3rd Cavalry Brigade
4th Mountain Brigade
5th Mountain Brigade
6th Special Forces Brigade
3rd Divisional Communications Brigade
3rd Divisional Air Defense Artillery

See also
1st Army Division
2nd Army Division
4th Army Division
5th Army Division

References

Military units and formations of Peru